Tyler Williamson (born May 17, 1972) is an American professional golfer who played on the Nationwide Tour.

Williamson joined the Nationwide Tour in 2002 and won the Preferred Health Systems Wichita Open in his rookie season. He continued to play on the Nationwide Tour until 2008.

Professional wins (3)

Nationwide Tour wins (1)

Other wins (2)
2000 Cypress Creek Golf Classic, Boomtown Casino Classic (both on NGA Hooters Tour)

External links

American male golfers
PGA Tour golfers
Golfers from Sacramento, California
California State University, Sacramento alumni
1972 births
Living people